Harlaw might refer to various things in Scotland:

 The Battle of Harlaw, 24 July 1411, fought near Inverurie
 Harlaw Academy, formerly Aberdeen High School for Girls, Aberdeen
 Harlaw Park, Inverurie, home ground of Inverurie Loco Works F.C.